Canalispira shacklefordi is a species of sea snail, a marine gastropod mollusk, in the family Cystiscidae.

References

shacklefordi
Gastropods described in 1915